The Litmore Snatch is a 1957 detective thriller novel by the British writer Henry Wade. It was his final novel. Like much of Wade's work it takes the form of a standard police procedural. A review in The Guardian by fellow crime writer Anthony Berkeley considered the "book is a quiet and almost factual account of the police procedure following the kidnapping of a small boy for ransom, and personally I found it fascinating"

Synopsis
The owner of a newspaper in a seaside town in the North East of England receives threatening letters. Soon afterwards his ten-year-old son is kidnapped and a £10,000 ransom demanded.

References

Bibliography
 Cooper, John & Pike, B.A. Artists in Crime: An Illustrated Survey of Crime Fiction First Edition Dustwrappers, 1920-1970. Scolar Press, 1995.
 Reilly, John M. Twentieth Century Crime & Mystery Writers. Springer, 2015.

1957 British novels
Novels by Henry Wade
British detective novels
British crime novels
British thriller novels
Constable & Co. books
Novels set in England